Sd.Kfz. 253 leichter Gepanzerter Beobachtungskraftwagen was a German half-track observation vehicle that was used by artillery forward observers to accompany tank and mechanized infantry units. The vehicle belonged to the Sd.Kfz. 250 family. The appearance was similar to the Sd.Kfz. 250, but the Sd.Kfz. 253 variant was fully enclosed. Demag/Wegman manufactured 285 vehicles between 1940–1941.

References 

"Leichte Gepanzerte Beobachtungskraftwagen Sd.Kfz.253"  www.achtungpanzer.com. Retrieved 2016-10-12.

World War II armoured fighting vehicles of Germany
World War II half-tracks
Half-tracks of Germany
Military vehicles introduced from 1940 to 1944